Crime in Addis Ababa, the capital of Ethiopia, is safer in comparison of other African cities. However, there are a number of crimes within the city including theft, scams, mugging, robbery and others. Rural-urban migration and unemployment has been preliminary factors affecting the city by elevating crime rate. 

Snatch theft such mobile purse snatching is common. According to Central Statistical Authority 2015 census, the total unemployment rate in Addis Ababa was 21.2% of which male accounting for 14.4% and females 28.6%. This signifies more idleness of young people which lead them to commit crime.

Overview
Criminal activities in Addis Ababa is safer than to most African cities. However, there was report of some minor crimes in the city. Scams, petty theft and mugging are the commonplace and there is smaller number of incidents such as sexual harassment of women and robbery. Criminal gangs are known to use distraction technique including begging or feigning illness. In addition, robberies are increasing in public site of Addis Ababa and especially prevalent at nighttime.

Types of crime
Socioeconomic factors can influence people's lives and their behavior and subsequent youth unemployment leads to crime in Addis Ababa, with particular reference to Addis Ketema sub-city woreda 8. According to the Ethiopian Federal Police Commission 2016 report, Addis Ababa is the second city in the Oromia Region in terms of frequency of criminal activity annually. In the same year, the Addis Ababa Police Commission reported that 47,890 crimes were registered ranges from property crimes of theft, snatch theft, robbery, fraud, and breach of trust were frequent crimes.

Thus, the crime rate in Addis Ababa is fluctuating year by year; accordingly, about 69,301 crimes were happened in the year 2013, 56,242 in 2015 while 64,437 in 2017.

Since 2013, the crime activity in Addis Ababa is increasing alarmingly daily. Mobile purse snatching, robbery, theft, mugging are some types of property crime which have been committing throughout Addis Ababa. Snatch theft using motorcycle happens rapidly where criminals usually grabs bags and other items of the victims in fast-paced duration and without forethought of the victims.

Unemployment
On other hands, unemployment is one of the most problems in the city. Besides, rural-urban migration also the basis factor to induce crime in Addis Ababa, especially without governmental policy. 2015 data showed that the percentage of unemployed person in Addis Ababa increased significantly with the urban average of 16.8%. Addis Ababa's total unemployment rate is 21.2% of which male accounting for 14.4% and females 28.6% according to Central Statistical Authority in 2015.

In 2018, 264,580 or 20% of unemployed population found in Addis Ababa (CSA 2019).

Terrorism reports
In May 2022, the Ethiopian government said 349 people were arrested in Addis Ababa ranging from planning terrorism to inciting violence.

References

Addis Ababa
Crime in Ethiopia
Crime in Addis Ababa